Oleg Pavlovich Mirny (born April 8, 1963) is a Russian football coach and a former player.

External links
Profile by the Russian Premier League

References

1963 births
Living people
Soviet footballers
FC Kuban Krasnodar players
FC Tyumen players
FC Lokomotiv Nizhny Novgorod players
FC Hoverla Uzhhorod players
Navbahor Namangan players
Russian footballers
FC KAMAZ Naberezhnye Chelny players
Russian Premier League players
Russian football managers
Association football midfielders